Zdeněk Rygel (born 1 March 1951, in Ostrava) is a former football player from Czechoslovakia. He was a member of the national team that won the gold medal at the 1980 Summer Olympics in Moscow. Rygel obtained a total number of four caps for his native country, between 1974-04-27 and 1975-06-07.

He played for Baník Ostrava and contributed to the best period in the history of the club. During his years as a player of the club, Baník won the Czechoslovak First League in 1976, 1980 and 1981. Baník also won the Czechoslovak Cup in 1978.

He is the father of footballer Daniel Rygel.

References

 
 Zdeněk Rygel slaví životní jubileum at official website of Baník Ostrava

1951 births
Living people
Sportspeople from Ostrava
Czech footballers
Czechoslovak footballers
FC Baník Ostrava players
FC Zbrojovka Brno players
Footballers at the 1980 Summer Olympics
Olympic gold medalists for Czechoslovakia
Olympic footballers of Czechoslovakia
Czechoslovakia international footballers
Olympic medalists in football
Medalists at the 1980 Summer Olympics
Association football defenders
EPA Larnaca FC players